The Schofield Building (previously known as the Euclid Ninth Tower) is a high-rise building in downtown Cleveland, Ohio. The , 14-story building is located at the southwest corner of East 9th Street and Euclid Avenue, adjacent to the Rose Building and the City Club Building in the city's Historic Gateway District. Built in 1902 as an office building, the seven lower floors are now home to the  Kimpton Schofield Hotel and the upper seven stories house apartments known as the Schofield Residences.

History
Owned by the Calabrese family of Cleveland, the Schofield was constructed as an office building. The structure was the work of Cleveland architect Levi Scofield, who was also responsible for the Soldiers' and Sailors' Monument on Public Square.

In the 1960s, the building was refaced to give it a modernist look, covering the ornamented terracotta architectural details with a steel facing.

The Schofield underwent an extensive five-year restoration and renovation to convert the building to a hotel-residential building, which opened in March 2016.

Recent developments
Cleveland family owned real estate & architecture firm, CRM (Calabrese, Racek, & Markos) and Kimpton Hotels & Restaurants Group oversaw the $50 million project to restore the exterior of a Cleveland landmark to its original early-20th-century appearance. In this new configuration, the Schofield's first seven floors have 122 hotel rooms and six suites, with the upper seven floors housing 52 apartments of varying sizes.

The Schofield restoration is one of the latest in a series of restoration projects dating back to the mid-1980s in the city; these projects include: Playhouse Square, the Terminal Tower, the Cleveland Arcade, Fenn Tower, the Warehouse District and the Greater Cleveland Aquarium.

References

External links

Apartment buildings in Cleveland
Skyscraper hotels in Cleveland
Skyscraper office buildings in Cleveland
Residential skyscrapers in Cleveland
Office buildings completed in 1902
Kimpton hotels